David Bruce (born October 7, 1964) is a Canadian former professional ice hockey player who played for the Vancouver Canucks, St. Louis Blues, and San Jose Sharks of the NHL.

Born in Thunder Bay, Ontario, Bruce played his junior hockey for the Kitchener Rangers from 1982 to 1984. After his first season, Bruce was drafted by the Vancouver Canucks in the 1983 NHL Entry Draft. He turned professional in 1984 with the Fredericton Express AHL affiliate of Vancouver. Bruce made his NHL debut in the 1985–86 season with the Canucks. Bruce played in the Canucks' organization until 1990, when he signed as a free agent with the St. Louis Blues. He played one season in the Blues' organization before being chosen in the 1991 NHL Expansion Draft by the new San Jose Sharks. Bruce played the 1991–92 season with the Sharks, his last full season in the NHL. He remained in the Sharks' organization until 1998 when he chose to go to Europe to play with the EV Landshut of the German League. He retired after the season.

Career statistics

Regular season and playoffs

External links

1964 births
Canadian ice hockey left wingers
EV Landshut players
Fredericton Express players
Ice hockey people from Ontario
Sportspeople from Thunder Bay
Kansas City Blades players
Kitchener Rangers players
Living people
Milwaukee Admirals (IHL) players
Peoria Rivermen (IHL) players
San Jose Sharks players
St. Louis Blues players
Vancouver Canucks draft picks
Vancouver Canucks players
Canadian expatriate ice hockey players in Germany